“The Ray of the Microcosm” is a romantic, cosmic-religious poem, written in 1845 by  Prince-Bishop and poet Petar II Petrović-Njegoš. It is written in the decasyllabic meter of Montenegrin epic poetry. Njegoš’s religious poetic thought achieved its highest artistic shape in this work.
 
The poem contains three main thematic parts. The first is the Dedication which introduces some of the most important philosophical and religious premises of the poem. The second part consists of two cantos which describe the cosmic flight of poet’s soul and its search for answers about origins and destiny of humankind on Earth. The third part comprises the remaining four cantos which describe Satan’s mutiny against God and fall of Adam and his legion from Heaven.

References 

Petar II Petrović-Njegoš
1845 poems
Serbian literature